Aalborg Pirates is a professional ice hockey team (previously known as Aalborg Ishockey and AaB Ice Hockey) playing in the Danish ice hockey league, Metal Ligaen. The ice hockey team first appeared in 1967 as AaB Ice Hockey organized under Aalborg Boldspilklub. They play in the Danish national league and won the Danish league championship in 1981. In 1997 AaB Ishockey merged with a smaller club, IK Aalborg. The merged team was known as Aalborg Ishockey Klub (AIK) in the period 1997–2003, but following financial instability in the club, the professional license was transferred to Aalborg Boldspilklub ('AaB’). The team is located in Aalborg in the northern part of Jutland and ceased operations at the end of the 2011/12 season, where it was put up for sale. In 2012 the team was bought by investors with the majority of the shares owned by entrepreneur and investor Magnus Kjøller. The team was replaced by a whole new team and organisation launched a "Masterplan 2018”

Historic results
 Season 1990/91: Ranked number 2.
 Season 1991/92: Ranked number 2.
 Season 1992/93: Ranked number 6.
 Season 1993/94: Ranked number 3.
 Season 1994/95: Ranked number 4.
 Season 1995/96: Ranked number 10.
 Season 1996/97: Ranked number 8.
 Season 1997/98: Ranked number 10.
 Season 1998/99: Ranked number 9.
 Season 1999/00: Ranked number 7.
 Season 2000/01: Ranked number 8.
 Season 2001/02: Ranked number 10.
 Season 2002/03: Ranked number 6.
 Season 2003/04: AaB won silvermedals losing to Esbjerg
 Season 2004/05: AaB won silvermedals losing to Herning Blue Fox
 Season 2005/06: AaB won the silvermedals in the 2005–06 season, losing to SønderjyskE in the final by 4 games to 2.
 Season 2006/07: AaB was eliminated in the quarterfinal losing to Odense Bulldogs
 Season 2008/09: AaB finished the regular season in 9th (only behind Frederikshavn by a goal difference of 1). But due to the bankruptcy of TOTEMPO HvIK were promoted up to 8th and qualified for the finals, they were eliminated in the quarterfinal by top seed and eventual silver medalists Herning Blue Fox
 Season 2009/10: AaB won the silver medals, losing the best of 7 final in 4 games to SønderjyskE
 Season 2010/11: Ranked number 4.
 Season 2011/12: Ranked number 5.
 Season 2012/13: Ranked number 3.
 Season 2013/14: Ranked number 3.
 Season 2014/15: Ranked number 8.
 Season 2015/16: Ranked number 8.
 Season 2016/17: Ranked number 1.

References

 
Ishockey
Ice hockey teams in Denmark
Sport in Aalborg
1967 establishments in Denmark
Ice hockey clubs established in 1967
Ice hockey clubs disestablished in 2012
2012 disestablishments in Denmark